The  Edmonton Eskimos season was the 57th season for the team in the Canadian Football League and their 66th overall. The Eskimos successfully improved upon their 4–14 record from 2013 after earning their fifth win in their sixth game. The Eskimos qualified for the playoffs and won the West Semi-Final over the Saskatchewan Roughriders, hosting their first playoff game since 2011. However, their season came to a close after they lost the West Final to the Calgary Stampeders, who defeated the Eskimos in all four meetings this season.

Offseason

CFL Draft
The 2014 CFL Draft took place on May 13, 2014.

Notable transactions 

*Later traded to the Saskatchewan Roughriders

Preseason

Regular season

Season standings

Season schedule

Total attendance: 301,367 
Average attendance: 33,485 (59.5%)

Post season

Schedule

Team

Roster

Coaching staff

References

Edmonton Elks seasons
2014 Canadian Football League season by team